Zalmoxes is an extinct genus of rhabdodontid ornithopod dinosaur from the Maastrichtian of Romania. The genus is known from specimens first named as the species Mochlodon robustum in 1899 by Franz Nopcsa before being reclassified as Rhabdodon robustum by him in 1915. In 1990 this name was corrected to Rhabdodon robustus by George Olshevsky, and in 2003 the species was once more reclassified, this time as the type species Zalmoxes robustus. Zalmoxes refers to the Dacian deity Zalmoxis, and robustus to the robustness of the remains. In 2003 another species was named, Zalmoxes shqiperorum, named for the Albanian name for Albanians.

History of discovery 

Zalmoxes was first known from numerous fossils found in Transylvania, which were named as the species Mochlodon robustus by Baron Franz Nopcsa in 1899. The specific name referred to its robust build. In 1915 Nopcsa renamed the species as Rhabdodon robustum, amended by in 2003 by David B. Weishampel, Coralia-Maria Jianu, Zoltan Csiki and David B. Norman. Weishampel et al. (2003) published a paper on new remains from Romania, which they found to represent a new species. They found R. robustus was sufficiently different from Rhabdodon, and thus named the new genus Zalmoxes for the former. The genus refers to the Dacian deity Zalmoxis (sometimes spelled Zalmoxes), who retreated for three years in a crypt to be resurrected on the fourth year; likewise the animal Zalmoxes had by Nopcsa been liberated from its fossil grave to attain taxonomic immortality. The naming article further explained this by referring to a Greek legend according to which Zalmoxes was a slave of Pythagoras who travelled to Dacia and was deified by the Dacian people. In addition, Weishampel et al. named the new specimens Zalmoxes shqiperorum, after Shqiperia, the Albanian name for Albania, with which country Nopcsa had had a special relationship. One specimen now belongs to Telmatosaurus, while another specimen is also suspected to belong to that genus based on similar basicrania morphology.

Description 

Zalmoxes is a rather small genus of bipedal herbivore with a large triangular head and a beak. An unnamed species of Zalmoxes, is known from larger sizes, with an adult  in length. Although Nopcsa thought the small size of Zalmoxes was due to island dwarfism, Attila Ösi and colleagues found it was closer to the size of the rhabdodontid ancestor, with larger Rhabdodon and smaller Mochlodon having island gigantism and island dwarfism respectively. However, when the species of Zalmoxes are taken into account separately, it can be seen than Z. shqiperorum continued the general size trend from Orodromeus to Tenontosaurus, while Z. robustus may have had slight nanism. Zalmoxes had a relatively slow growth rate and long growth period, suggesting that this dinosaur may have had a unique growth strategy.

Z. robustus is known from about 80% of the skull. However, no complete articulated skull is known, and most of the bones do not overlap and are found in isolation. Weishampel et al. found that these likely represented one individual, as the bones were from the same formation and are the same colour. Four individuals were identified by Nopcsa for Z. robustus, and from these it can be seen that there is skeletal variation in the species. Like with the cranial material, vertebrae of Z. robustus are often found isolated. All regions of the vertebral column are represented in the fossil record, although no sternal plates have been found yet. The sacrum includes three vertebrae, with two sacrodorsals (dorsal vertebrae in the sacrum) and three sacrocaudals (caudal vertebrae in the sacrum). The limb and girdle bones are also well represented, with only the hands (manus) and feet (pes) mostly lacking.

While more poorly known than Z. robustus, Z. shqiperorum is still known from a relatively large amount of the skeleton. Only two mostly complete skeletons are known, the holotype adult, and a referred juvenile. The lower jaw (dentary) of Z. shqiperorum is relatively shorter than the equivalent in Z. robustus, although it is much larger. Ossified tendons are known from the juvenile specimen, showing that they were circular or elliptical in cross section and have fine striations in Z. shqiperorum. Cervical, dorsal and caudal vertebrae are known from Z. shqiperorum, although the former two are only represented by juvenile material. A complete articulated sacrum is known for Z. shqiperorum, with three vertebrae and at least two sacrodorsals. No manual material is known from the species, although a metatarsal and a few phalanges are known.

Classification 

The species of Mochlodon, Rhabdodon and Zalmoxes had long had an uncertain phylogenetic placement, being referred to various families..Nopcsa (1901) also had referred the genus to Hypsilophodontidae, and he suggested affinities with Camptosaurus in 1902b, 1904 and 1915. Nopcsa (1915) also realized that Rhabdodon  and Mochlodon may be congeneric, placing the complex in Camptosauridae.

For the next half-century, taxonomic workers found Rhabdodon and Mochlodon within either Camptosauridae or Iguanodontidae. However, Paul Sereno (1986) found that Rhabdodon and Mochlodon were within Iguanodontia. The ICZN (1988) resolved this complication, selecting the ornithopod Rhabdodon as having priority over Mochlodon. From this publication, scientists began placing Rhabdodon and Mochlodon within Euornithopoda. In 2003, Weishampel et al. named a new family for Mochlodon, Rhabdodon and the new genus Zalmoxes. This family, Rhabdodontidae, was placed as a derived within Iguanodontia. Further studies support this placement of Rhabdodontidae, phylogenetically between Talenkauen and Tenontosaurus.

Below are two possible phylogenies of Rhabdodontidae by McDonald et al. (2010; left), and Ösi et al. (2012; right).

Paleobiology 
Zalmoxes is a more robust animal than its precursors and more derived relatives, and has a rotund build. Infraspecific ontogenetic growth is relatively well known in Zalmoxes as there is juvenile material known for the species. Nopcsa proposed that the animals of the Hateg Basin, which were smaller than their relatives elsewhere, adapted through insular dwarfism. Fossils of both species of Zalmoxes have been unearthed in the Sânpetru Formation, the Sebes Formation and Densuş-Ciula Formation in Romania, both species have been found exclusively in the Hateg Island region.

Diet 
A scientific paper from 2003 found that Zalmoxes most likely had a diet that consisted of tough fibrous plants like soft shoots, horsetails, angiosperms, pteridophytes, and ferns.

References

External links 

 Dinosaur Mailing List entry (announces the formal publication of Zalmoxes)

Iguanodonts
Maastrichtian life
Late Cretaceous dinosaurs of Europe
Fossils of Romania
Hațeg fauna
Fossil taxa described in 2003
Taxa named by David B. Weishampel
Taxa named by David B. Norman
Ornithischian genera